Harry Kümel (born 27 January 1940) is a Belgian film director.

His 1971 vampire feature Daughters of Darkness (Les lèvres rouges; Fr, "The Red Lips"), starring Delphine Seyrig became a cult hit in Europe and the United States. He also directed the film version of Malpertuis (1971), featuring Orson Welles and adapted from the 1943 novel by Jean Ray.

He also directed Monsieur Hawarden (1969) about the cross-dressing Meriora Gillibrand whose two male lovers fought a duel in Vienna. She then killed the survivor and fled to Belgium dressed as a man.  She took the name Hawarden from a family related to hers in Lancashire. The film is a fictionalised account; her grave can still be seen near Malmedy in the German-speaking part of Belgium.

He made a cameo appearance in several fiction novels, among others:

Nicholas Royle's novel Antwerp.

Hubert Lampo's magic-realistic novel The Scent of Sandalwood.

From 1969 until the present, teacher of cinema at various film institutes, among many: The Dutch Film and Television Academy - Amsterdam (NFTA), Institut des Arts de Diffusion - Brussels (IAD), Royal Institute for Theatre, Cinema and Sound - Brussels (RITS), Université libre de Bruxelles (ULB)...

Filmography
Erasmus (1962)
Hendrik Conscience (1963)
Waterloo (1964)
De Grafbewaker (1965)
Monsieur Hawarden (1969)
Daughters of Darkness (1971)
Malpertuis (1973)
De Komst van Joachim Stiller (1976)
 (1978)
The Secrets of Love (1985)
Eline Vere (1991)

References

External links

1940 births
Living people
Belgian film directors
Mass media people from Antwerp
20th-century Belgian people